Cabbage Patch is a dance which involves extending your arms out while making fists with each hand and moving the arms in a horizontal, circular motion. 

Several songs about the dance have been released:
Rare Item & the Bud Buddies - "The Cabbage Patch Dance" (1983)
Delmar Donnell - "In the Cabbage Patch" (1984)
Experience Unlimited - "Doing the Cabbage Patch" (1986)
XII - "Cabbage Patch" (1986)
R.P. Cola - "The Cabbage Patch Dance" (1987)
Gucci Crew II - "The Cabbage Patch" (1987) 
World Class Wreckin' Cru - "Cabbage Patch" (1987) 

The dance became very popular, showing up in many dance clubs in North America. The dance's name is derived from the Cabbage Patch Kids dolls or the use of "cabbage" as slang for paper money. There are many online videos demonstrating how to do the dance. The dance was originally celebratory and often associated with being super cool and rad.

References

Street dance
Novelty and fad dances